Marguerite Horner is a British artist who won the 2018 British Women Artist Award. Her paintings aim to investigate, among other things, notions of transience, intimacy, loss and hope. She uses the external world as a trigger or metaphor for these experiences and through a period of gestation and distillation, makes a series of intuitive decisions that lead the work towards completion.

Biography
Marguerite Horner was born in Lincoln, and from 1973 to 1976 studied art at Sheffield University.  She graduated with an M.A. from the City and Guilds of London Art School in 2004 and was presented with the Kidd Rapinet Prize for outstanding degree work. Since graduating from City and Guilds of London Art school in 2004, Horner has exhibited internationally in Art fairs and group shows. In 2011, she exhibited at the 54th Venice Biennale with Afternoon Tea for the WW Gallery and in 2012 received her first London solo exhibition, The Seen and Unseen, at The Pitzhanger Manor Gallery. The catalogue essay was written by Lady Marina Vaizey CBE. In 2017, Horner won the NOA17 MS Amlin Prize for "Church", a painting that was inspired by a humanitarian visit to the Calais refugee "jungle" in 2014, with a "Cenacle" prayer group formed by the Chiswick Comboni nuns. In 2018, Horner won the British Women Artist Award and examples of her work were acquired by the Yale Centre for British Art in New Haven Connecticut. Her work has also been acquired by a number of museums including the Abbot Hall Art Gallery, Falmouth Art Gallery, the Madison Museum of Fine Art, Rugby Art Gallery and Museum, Schneider Museum of Art, Sheffield City Art Gallery, Swindon Art Gallery and the Nanxi Academy of Art Collection in China.

Horner trained and worked as a scenic artist for the BBC after graduating with her BA Fine Art in 1976 until 1981. From 1985 to 2000, she worked as a freelance scenic artist and mural painter on advertising and editorial campaigns, films and BBC TV productions. Her clients included the Sunday Times Magazine and World of Interiors. In 2012 Horner took a  Foundation degree in pastoral mission at Heythrop College, a Philosophy and Theology college of the University of London.

Selected solo exhibitions 
 Transcends All Understanding, Bermondsey Project Space, London (2020)
 Time Keeps Slipping, Bermondsey Project Space, London (2019)
 Keep me Safe, Westminster Reference Library and Farm Street Church, Mayfair, London (2017) 
 Cars and Streets, Bermondsey Project Space, London (2015)
 Through each Today, The Crypt, St Marylebone Parish Church, London (2013)
 The Seen and Unseen, Pitzhanger Manor, London (2012)
 Marguerite Horner: Paintings, Usher Gallery, Lincoln (2006)
 Marguerite Horner: Paintings, Mappin Art Gallery, Sheffield (2006)

Selected group exhibitions 
Beyond Other Horizons, Iasi Palace of Culture, Romania (1–31 March 2020) - curator Peter Harrap; Anna McNay; Florin Ungureanu, funded by the Romanian Cultural Institute with a A British Council symposium 3 March 2020: 
 When London Meets Wenzhou (2019), Nanxi Academy, Wenzhou, China.
 The Ruskin Prize Exhibition (2019), shortlisted
 The Royal Academy Summer Exhibition (2005–2008–2010–2011–2012–2013–2016–2019)
 The Threadneedle Prize Exhibition (2010–2013–2018)
 Lynn Painter Stainer Prize Exhibition (2010–2012–2017–2018)
 The National Open Art Competition (2011–2012–2014–2015–2016–2017)
 The Griffin Open (2015)
 The ING Discerning Eye (2005–2010–2011–2012–2013–2014–2015–2016–2018–2020–2021)
 The Sunday Times Watercolour Exhibition (2014)
 The Royal Watercolour Society Contemporary Watercolour Competition (2019)
 58th Venice Biennale 'Alive in the Universe' Caroline Wiseman gallery (2019)
 Dear Christine...A Tribute to Christine Keeler, Vane gallery, Newcastle (2019); Elysium Gallery, Swansea (2019); Arthouse1 London (2020).
 54th Venice Biennale Afternoon Tea, WW Gallery (2011)
 Made in Britain, National Gallery, Gdansk, Poland (2019)
 LANDE: The Calais 'Jungle' and Beyond, Pitts Rivers Museum, Oxford (2019)
 The Trinity Buoy Wharf Drawing Prize- shortlisted (2018)
 In the City, East Gallery, Norwich University of the Arts, then Stephen Lawrence Gallery, London (2018)
 Getting Away, Arthouse1, Bermondsey, London SE1 then Quay Gallery, Isle of Wight (2018)
 The Inner and the Outer, co-curated by Horner and Trevor Burgess. Bermondsey Project Space, London SE1 3UW.(2018)
 In the Future, Collyer Bristow Gallery, London (2018)
 Contemporary Masters from Britain: 80 British Painters of the 21st Century, toured to four venues in China: Yantai Art Museum; Artall Gallery, Nanjing; Jiangsu Arts Museum, Nanjing: Tianjin Academy of Fine Art, Tianjin, China (2017)
 The National Open Art Competition (2017). Winner of the MSAmlin Award for painting Church
 Anything Goes, Art Bermondsey Project Space, London (2017)
 Silence Un-Scene, Lewisham Art House, London (2017) 
 Edgelands, UK Tour: APT Gallery London,(2016); Aberystwth; Hartlepool; Alison Richards Building, Cambridge; Beverley Museum & Gallery (2017)
 Contemporary Master from the East of England, The Cut, Halesworth. Suffolk (2017)
 The Derwent Art Prize (2016)
 Contemporary British Watercolours, Burton Art Gallery & Museum, Devon (2016) then at The Oriel Gallery, Ballinskelligs, Co. Kerry (2015) and Maidstone Museum & Bentlif Art Gallery, Kent (2015)
 Rugby Collection 2015, Rugby Art Gallery and Museum (2015)
 Brentwood Stations of The Cross, Brentwood Cathedral (2015)
 Present Tense, Swindon Art Gallery (2015)
 @PaintBritain, Ipswich Art School Gallery, Ipswich (2014)
 Contemporary British Painting, The Crypt St Marylebone Parish Church, London (2014) and Huddersfield Art Gallery (2014)
 The Open West, the Wilson, Cheltenham Art Gallery & Museum (2013)
 In The City, The Lion and Lamb Gallery, London (2011)
 The Artsway Open (2010)
 The MacGuffin, WW Gallery, London (2005)
 Mirage of Mind, Century Gallery, London (2005)
 Falmouth Art Gallery
 The Priseman Seabrook Collection
 The Komechak Art Gallery of Benedictine University, Chicago. U.S.

References

External links

1954 births
Living people
21st-century British painters
21st-century British women artists
Alumni of the University of Sheffield
Alumni of the City and Guilds of London Art School
English painters
People from Lincoln, England